The following is a list of characters that appear in the TV animated series Miraculous: Tales of Ladybug & Cat Noir, and its films and specials.

Main

Marinette Dupain-Cheng / Ladybug

Marinette Dupain-Cheng a.k.a. Ladybug (voiced by Cristina Vee in the English dub, Karin Nanami in the Japanese dub and by Anouck Hautbois in the French version) is a quarter French, quarter Italian, half Chinese 14-year-old student at Françoise Dupont High School (Collége Françoise Dupont). Marinette is sweet, joyful, clumsy, and sometimes a bit awkward, but respected and generally popular amongst her peers and is extremely intelligent despite her occasional clumsy ways. She is also an extremely talented fashion designer. Marinette is deeply in love with Adrien Agreste, to whom she can barely speak to out of nervousness. She later develops romantic attraction for Luka Couffaine, but they break up and decide to remain friends.

Using the Ladybug Miraculous, Marinette can transform into the superheroine "Ladybug". As Ladybug, she becomes more confident and serious, often brushing off Cat Noir's advances on her, unaware that he is secretly Adrien. Her transformation call is "Tikki, Spots On!" (French: Tikki, transforme-moi!, "Tikki, transform me!"). Her weapon is a yo-yo and her special power is "Lucky Charm", which allows her to create an object to help solve a specific problem, defeating or helping to defeat an akumatized villain. Once the problem has been solved, she is able to use her second power, "Miraculous Ladybug", to restore things to the way they were and repair all damage. Her yo-yo is also capable of capturing and purifying akumas, storing items and acts as a phone and communicator for her to use. When she becomes the Guardian, Ladybug has the ability to give other characters Miraculouses through her yo-yo. She also learned how to create "Magical Charms", which were temporarily used to prevent people from becoming villains.

Marinette has sometimes used other Miraculous jewels; with the Cat Miraculous, she became "Lady Noir" twice, and with the Mouse Miraculous, she became "Multimouse". On several occasions, Marinette has used other Miraculouses in conjunction with her own, "unifying" their power into one to gain new abilities; thus far, she has unified with the Dragon Miraculous to become "Dragonbug", the Bee Miraculous to become "Lady Bee", the Horse Miraculous to become "Pegabug", and the Horse and Rabbit Miraculouses to become "Pennybug".

Marinette later becomes the new Guardian of the Miraculous in Paris, succeeding her mentor Master Fu.

Unlike most characters, she has never been transformed into a villain; but she came close to in "Ladybug" where she was given the name "Princess Justice" and said to have the ability to expose truth. It was not completed due to Nathalie's illness, she was almost akumatized into "Unmasker" by Monarch, but rejected the akuma.

Adrien Agreste / Cat Noir

Adrien Agreste a.k.a. Cat Noir ("Black Cat") (French: Chat Noir) (voiced by Bryce Papenbrook in the English dub, Ryōta Ōsaka in the Japanese dub and Benjamin Bollen in the French version)is Marinette's crush, although he is oblivious to that and only sees Marinette as a friend. Adrien comes from a wealthy family, is half French, half English and is a popular fashion model for the clothing company of his father Gabriel, but he laments his father's distant relationship. Adrien is kind, loyal, sensitive and well-liked, and hangs out often with his best friend Nino Lahiffe.

Using the Cat Miraculous, Adrien can transform into Cat Noir, Ladybug's partner. As Cat Noir, he is more rebellious, care-free, and flirty. His transformation call is "Plagg, Claws Out!" (French: Plagg, transforme-moi!, "Plagg, transform me!"). His weapon is a multi-functional staff and his special power, "Cataclysm", allows him to destroy anything he touches. As both Cat Noir and Adrien, he has a deep romantic attraction for Ladybug, unaware that she is Marinette. He temporarily has a relationship with Kagami Tsurugi, but they break up.

Adrien has temporarily used the Ladybug Miraculous twice to become "Mister Bug" and the Snake Miraculous to become "Aspik". Like Ladybug, he can unify Miraculouses together, once using the Snake Miraculous to become "Snake Noir". In one episode, he becomes a second cat hero called "Cat Walker" (French: "Patte De Velours"). He later returns to original hero persona. He also has unified the Rabbit Miraculous with his own to become Rabbit Noir.

He has been turned into a villain in two erased timelines: as Cat Noir, he has become an uber-powerful version called "Cat Blanc", and in his civilian form, he became "Ephemeral", who has the ability to speed up time. Ephemeral means to "last a short time", which ties into the ability.

Tikki
Tikki (voiced by Mela Lee in the English dub, Maria Naganawa in the Japanese dub and Marie Nonnenmacher in the French version) is the Kwami of Creation 
who resides within the Ladybug Miraculous, a pair of earrings that Marinette uses to transform into Ladybug. Tikki is a positive and serious Kwami, who believes strongly in Marinette and she gives her advice to be the best that she can be, regardless of transformation. She is more than 13 billion years old and has watched over every Ladybug since the beginning, one of her Miraculous's previous owners being Joan of Arc. Thomas Astruc, the show's creator, has written on Twitter that Tikki means "happiness".

Plagg
Plagg (voiced by Max Mittelman in the English dub, Hiroshi Kohsaka in the Japanese dub and Thierry Kazazian in the French version) is the Kwami of Destruction who enables Adrien to transform into Cat Noir. Plagg looks much like Tikki, but with a black body, green eyes, and pointed ears, resembling a black cat. Unlike Tikki, however, Plagg is sarcastic and lazy. Although he cares for Adrien, he is less invested in his problems and often gives wrong or destructive advice. His favorite food is camembert, which he is shown to have an obsession for. During Adrien's transformation as Cat Noir, he inhabits the Black Cat Miraculous, a ring worn by Adrien on his right hand. He can use his Cataclysm ability without a holder, but his unrestrained power is catastrophic.

Gabriel Agreste / Hawk Moth / Shadow Moth / Monarch  
Gabriel Agreste (born as Gabi Grassette), also known as: Hawk Moth (lit. "The Butterfly"), Scarlet Moth (lit. "Scarlet Butterfly"), Shadow Moth (lit. "Shadow Butterfly"), and Monarch (French: Le Monarque), (voiced by Keith Silverstein in the English dub, Hayato Fujii in the Japanese dub and Antoine Tomé in the French version) is a famous fashion designer, and Adrien's strict, overprotective, and emotionally abusive father. He serves as the main antagonist of the series, using the Butterfly Miraculous to transforms into the supervillain "Hawk Moth". His weapon is a cane that acts as a sword stick, and his special power is to "Akumatize" people. Using Akumas, corrupted butterflies that are drawn to negative emotions, he is able to transform his victims into supervillains with special powers. Later in the show, he also creates "Megakumas" that can nullify the Magical Charms.

His main motivation is to obtain Ladybug and Cat Noir's Miraculouses, using their combined power to restore his comatose wife, Emilie. As Hawk Moth and Monarch, his transformation call is "Nooroo, Dark Wings Rise!". As Shadow Moth, his transformation call is "Nooroo, Duusu, Dual Metamorphosis!".

When the heroes nearly discover his secret identity, he turns himself into "the Collector", who can trap anything in his sketchbook. In several episodes, he has transformed into "Scarlet Moth", who can create as many Akumas as he wants, with the help of "Catalyst", the Akumatized form of his assistant Nathalie Sancoeur.
Gabriel later unifies the Butterfly and Peacock Miraculouses to become "Shadow Moth", allowing him to use the ability of "Amokization". This allows him to create sentimonsters, magical lifeforms with whatever forms and abilities he desires. In an erased timeline, he takes the Cat Miraculous and unifies with it to become "Shadow Noir" (French: Chatpillon), he also successfully unifies with the Ladybug Miraculous.

During the fourth season finale, Gabriel gives the Peacock Miraculous to Félix to acquire the other Miraculouses in exchange, becoming more powerful while renaming himself "Monarch". But the possession of multiple Miraculous causes Gabriel to become further obsessed, Nathalie refusing to aid him further when he uses the Rabbit Miraculous to defeat Ladybug and Cat Noir in the past instead of attempting to save Emilie before she fell into her coma, which allows the heroes to obtain the Rabbit from him. Sometime later, he decides to have Kwamis tell him Ladybug's address, only to be led into a trap set by Ladybug and Cat Noir that he escapes by using the latter's Cataclysm on his forearm, rendering it necrotic. Becoming partners with Tomoe Tsurugi, (and not wanting to chance Ladybug and Cat Noir cornering him again) Gabriel decides to remold the Miraculous jewels into his personal Alliance Rings, smart rings that allow him to channel a Miraculous' power to the wearer, allowing him to use their powers for himself as well as enabling him to easily share their powers with his villains, making them even more powerful while also serving as a means to track down Ladybug and Cat Noir while also using the Kwami's power to prevent the necrosis from the Cataclysm to spread throughout his entire body. Monarch temporarily seizes the Ladybug and the Cat Miraculous, but their Kwamis, Tikki and Plagg, manage to stall him long enough for Marinette to take them back.

Major recurring

Alya Césaire / Rena Rouge / Scarabella
Alya Césaire (voiced by Carrie Keranen in the English dub, Aya Kawakami in the Japanese dub and Fanny Bloc in the French version) is Marinette's best friend. She constantly helps Marinette with her problems, most of which pertain to Marinette trying to speak to Adrien; she is often seen helping or encouraging her. She aspires to be a journalist and is in charge of the school blog. She is a big fan of superheroes, in particular Ladybug; she even operates a fansite known as the Ladyblog. Alya was initially unaware of Marinette's double life like everyone else before the fourth season when the latter confines her identity as Ladybug to 
her. Since then, Alya continues to support Marinette in her new role as Guardian of the Miraculous.

She usually uses the Fox Miraculous to transform into "Rena Rouge" ("Red Fox") with the transformation call of "Trixx, Let's Pounce!" ("Trixx, transform me!"), armed with a flute that doubles as a staff which allows her create illusions through her "Mirage" ability. Although her identity is eventually revealed, Alya is called upon for support as Rena Rouge once before being eventually allowed to keep her Miraculous, assuming a blue-colored variant of her hero form called "Rena Furtive" ("Secret Fox") to protect her identity until she returns the Miraculous to Marinette once her identity is exposed again. In the fifth season, Alya occasionally stands in for Marinette by using the Ladybug Miraculous to become the superhero "Scarabella".

Her villain form is "Lady Wifi", whose smartphone can fire magical icons and allows her to teleport through phones. Lady Wifi has sometimes teamed up with Princess Fragrance, Reflekta, and once with Horrificator and Timebreaker. She is the first villain to break free of Shadow Moth's control. As Rena Rouge, she has been akumatized into "Rena Rage". One time, she and her love interest Nino fused into "Oblivio", who can erase people's memories.

Nino Lahiffe / Carapace
Nino Lahiffe a.k.a. Carapace (voiced by Ben Diskin in seasons 1–3 of the English dub, Zeno Robinson starting with Miraculous World: New York: United Heroez of the English dub, Takayuki Miyamoto in the Japanese dub and Alexandre Nguyen in the French version) is Adrien's best friend who dresses in skate punk fashion, typically seen with headphones around his neck and a cap on his head. He DJs at the school's radio station. Nino had a crush on Marinette, but later becomes a couple with Alya.

He sometimes uses the Turtle Miraculous to turn into "Carapace". His weapon is a shield and his special power, "Shell-ter", allows him to create a force field. His transformation call is "Wayzz, Shell On!" ("Wayzz, transform me!"). Despite his identity being revealed, he is often called upon throughout the series.

His main villain form is "The Bubbler", who can create and manipulate soap bubbles. He has also become "Rocketear", who can throw exploding tears from his eyes. As Carapace, he has been akumatized into "Shell Shock". With Alya, he has become Oblivio.

When asked about Alya and Nino's ethnicity, Astruc wrote on Twitter that one of them was from Réunion, and later wrote that Alya was from Martinique.

Chloé Bourgeois / Queen Bee
Chloé Bourgeois (voiced by Selah Victor in the English dub, Arisa Sakuraba in the Japanese dub and Marie Chevalot in the French version) is a student in Miss Bustier's class. She is selfish, overzealous, and spoiled, only showing a little remorse when she needs to. She often uses her father and her best friend Sabrina Raincomprix to do whatever she wants while claiming her childhood best friend Adrien Agreste as he boyfriend, making her antagonistic towards Marinette despite being a fan of Ladybug.

Chloé accidentally acquired the Bee Miraculous during the second season, which she used to transform into "Queen Bee". Her weapon is a spinning top and her special power, "Venom", allows her to paralyze any sentient being. Her transformation call is "Pollen, Buzz On!" (French: Pollen, transforme-moi!, "Pollen, transform me!"). Despite publicly revealing her secret identity, Ladybug gave her a second chance but will only give her the Bee Miraculous when needed. This caused Chloé's trust in Ladybug to waver despite remaining hopeful of being part of the team before she being snubbed by Ladybug while her parents were akumatized causes her to betray the heroes to Hawk Moth while exposing Alya and Nino's hero alter egos in the third-season finale, resulting in her being permanently relieved of the Bee Miraculous and denouncing Ladybug as her hero. By the fourth season, Chloé became hated by most of Paris and later allies herself with Lila Rossi out of mutual hatred for both Ladybug and Marinette.

Chloé has been akumatized multiple times or played a role in another's akumatization. Her forms include "Antibug", an evil version of Ladybug; "Queen Banana", able to turn people into bananas; "Penalty", who commands the "Penalteam" that control a real world soccer game; and "Sole Destroyer", who can turn people into living shoes. In the Miraculous Rise of the Sphinx video game, she has been akumatized into "Clonika" who is capable of creating clones of other people. Chloé also had been akumatized while using the Bee Miraculous, first as "Queen Wasp" whose swarm of wasps can paralyze people and then again as "Miracle Queen", an upgraded version of Queen Wasp who can brainwash people.

In an early concept, Chloé was set to appear in a trio with Sabrina and Alix; intended to be a reference to Clover, Sam and Alex from the French-Canadian animated series Totally Spies!.

Tom Dupain
Tom Dupain (voiced by Christopher Corey Smith in the English dub, Takehiro Hasu in the Japanese dub and Martial Le Minoux in the French version) is Marinette's father and the proprietor of his family bakery, the Tom & Sabine Boulangerie Pâtisserie, and he is very passionate about working there, often helping Marinette while she is at the bakery, and showing her how to do things. He is named after Thomas Astruc, the creator of the series.

His villain form is "Weredad", a werewolf-like bodyguard who can control thorny vines. He has once teamed up with Qilin, Befana, and Bakerix as the Dearest Family. He has also akumatized into Weredad in the Miraculous Rise of the Sphinx video game, where he controls papers instead of vines.

Sabine Cheng
Sabine Cheng (voiced by Philece Sampler in season 1-4 of the English dub, Anne Yatco in season 4 of the English dub, Eiko Hanawa in the Japanese dub and Jessie Lambotte in the French version) is Marinette's mother. She was born in China as Cheng Xia Bing (Xia Bing Cheng in western order) before taking the name Sabine when she moved to Paris.

Her main villain form is "Qilin", an armored warrior who can move things with her mind and control the wind. She has once teamed up with Weredad, Befana, and Bakerix as the Dearest Family. She was also almost akumatized into "Verity Queen" in "Ladybug", but her transformation was not completed due to Nathalie's illness.

Wang Fu / Jade Turtle 
Master Wang Fu (Chinese: 王富 Wáng Fu), (voiced by Paul St. Peter in the English dub, Takayuki Miyamoto in the Japanese dub and Gilbert Lévy in the French version) is a short man who was the former Guardian of the Miraculous. He claims that he is 186 years old. He used to help Marinette and Adrien by giving them Miraculouses to loan and creating potions to help them defeat tough villains.

Prior to the events of the series, when Fu was still a guardian-in-training, he created a sentimonster that accidentally destroyed the Guardians' temple, with the Butterfly and Peacock Miraculouses, as well as a spellbook, lost in the chaos; however, the damage is later undone.

When Hawk Moth learns his identity, Fu turns into turtle hero "Jade Turtle" to protect himself. However, he is overpowered, so he transfers the title of Guardian to Marinette, losing all his memories in the process. He departs Paris with his old love Marianne Lenoir, and they marry.

In one episode, Fu and Marianne return to Paris, and he is akumatized in "Furious Fu", a tall painter who can bring words to life with his talismans.

Placide I.T.
Placide I.T. (voiced by Ezra Weisz in the English dub and Guilbert Lévy in the French version), nicknamed "Gorilla" by Adrien and his friends, is the bodyguard and chauffeur of Adrien. He has a massive exterior and never speaks at all, only communicating through grunts and expressions. He cares for Adrien's safety and happiness and almost never leaves his side.

His villain form is Gorizilla, a giant gorilla with a keen sense of smell.

Nathalie Sancoeur / Mayura
Nathalie Sancoeur a.k.a. Mayura ("Peacock") (voiced by Sabrina Weisz in the English dub, Arisa Sakuraba in the Japanese dub and Marie Chevalot in the French version) is Gabriel Agreste's personal assistant and bodyguard, previously a treasure hunter. She willfully assists him in his goals, both as Gabriel and Hawk Moth, out of romantic attraction. She served as the secondary antagonist until the beginning of the season 5.

Using the Peacock Miraculous, she can transform into "Mayura". Her weapon is a hand-fan, and she has the power to "amokize" people. Using corrupted amok feathers, she can create sentimonsters who act as allies and protectors of her victims. Her transformation call is "Duusu, Spread my Feathers!". Because her Miraculous is damaged, she grows bedridden, which continues even after the Miraculous is repaired. In later episodes, she is recovering slowly and started using leg braces. Nathalie eventually refused to aid Gabriel in his plans following his first defeat as Monarch when he was too obsessed with the Ladybug and Cat Miraculous to prevent Emilie's coma through the Rabbit Miraculous, while she remains in the Argeste family's employ to protect Adrien and also becomes concerned for Gabriel's health as Cat Noir's cataclysm begins to take its tool on him.

Her initial villain form is Catalyst who can boost others' powers, assuming the form to turn Hawk Moth into Scarlet Moth. She has also been akumatized into Safari, a hunter who never fails to catch her target and has been granted the power of the Goat Miraculous.

Lila Rossi
Lila Rossi (real name unknown), (voiced by Lisa Kay Jennings in the English dub, Sayaka Kitahara in the Japanese dub and Clara Soares in the French version) is one of Ms. Bustier's students and a recurring antagonist in the series. An Italian diplomat's daughter, she is a compulsive liar who craves attention and uses dishonest means to get it. After being first called out on her lies by Ladybug, claiming to be friends with her to get go to Adrien, Lila swears vengeance against Marinette and her alter ego. To this end, having secretly deduced Hawkmoth's identity, Lila eventually partners with Gabriel to keep tabs on Adrien as means to akumatize those she manipulates, and later join forces with Chloe as well. Gabriel also used Lila as a scanned model alongside Adrien to create the virtual assistants in his Alliance Rings. But when Gabriel terminates their agreement, Lila decides to acquire blackmail on Gabriel in retaliation. According to Thomas Astruc, she was intentionally created to be unlovable.

Lila's usual villainess form is "Volpina", a copy of a Fox Miraculous holder with the ability to create illusions. Her other villain forms are  "Chameleon", who can shapeshift into anyone by kissing them, and "Hoaxer", an upgraded version of Volpina with the added ability to hack into the Alliance's system and brainwash people with her posts.

Kagami Tsurugi / Ryuko
Kagami Tsurugi a.k.a. Ryuko ("Dragon Child") (voiced by Faye Mata in the English dub, Nanako Mori in the Japanese dub and Clara Soares in the French version) is a Japanese teen girl who is introduced in season 2. She hails from a family of celebrated fencers, and often acts as Adrien's main opponent in his fencing classes. Like Adrien, she feels isolated and desires freedom from her strict and controlling mother, Tomoe. She also has feelings for Adrien, and thus presented as a rival for Marinette, however the two eventually become friends. She temporarily becomes Adrien's love interest although she and Adrien break up, despite their parents' thoughts on the subject as Kagami eventually stood up to Tomoe.

She sometimes uses the Dragon Miraculous to transform into "Ryuko". Her weapon is a sword and her special power allows her to call upon three separate transformations into air, water or lightning. Her transformation call is "Longg, bring the storm!". Although her identity is accidentally revealed, she is often called upon throughout the series.

Her villain forms include "Riposte", an armored samurai with a sword blade for a right hand who can slice through anything, she has been upgraded into "Riposte Prime" whom in addition to her powers can also use the power of the Turtle Miraculous; "Oni-Chan", who can aggressively pursue anyone she has marked; "Lies", who can paralyze anyone who has lied and "Ryukomori", a cloudy giant with the power of the Dragon Miraculous.

Luka Couffaine / Viperion
Luka Couffaine (also Couphène) (voiced by Andrew Russell in the English dub, Yuuichirou Umehara in the Japanese dub and Gauthier Battoue in the French version) is the twin brother of Juleka Couffaine. He is Marinette's temporary love interest and serves as her voice of comfort, even after they have broken up.

Using the Snake Miraculous, he can transform into "Viperion". His weapon is a lyre and his special power, "Second Chance", lets him rewind time up to five minutes to fix a mistake. His transformation call is "Sass, scales slither!" He is often called upon throughout the series. He also learns Ladybug and Cat Noir's identities, but he doesn't tell anyone.

He has had two villain forms: "Silencer", who can steal people's voices and imitate them by talking with his hands, and "Truth", who can force people to tell the truth.

Minor recurring

Félix Fathom / Argos
Félix Fathom (voiced by Bryce Papenbrook in the English dub, Ryota Osaka in the Japanese dub and Benjamin Bollen in the French version) is Adrien's maternal cousin and Gabriel's nephew who lives with his mother, Amelie, in London. He is almost identical in appearance to Adrien, and a skilled magician and martial artist. His father Colt Fathom died sometime prior to the series and Felix became embittered towards his uncle Gabriel when the Argestes did not attend the funeral. However, Félix still cared for Adrien and wanted to free him from his father and those like him who abuse their authority.

Félix, with his mother's support, spends most of the fourth season trying to steal Gabriel and Emilie's wedding rings, which are family heirlooms. He manages to steal Gabriel's ring and learns of his super villain identity in the process, taking advantage of this when Ladybug unknowing gave him the Dog Miraculous to become "Flairmidable". Felix extorts his uncle into giving him the Peacock Miraculous while giving his uncle back his ring along the other Miraculous besides the ones owned by Ladybug and Cat Noir. After befriending Duusu, using the Peacock Miraculous to become "Argos", Félix has his mother cover his tracks as he goes incognito to eventually execute his plan to get rid of Gabriel. But after creating the sentimonster Red Moon and unwittingly snapping away Marinette, Félix realizes he is no different than his uncle and restores everyone while wishing Red Moon out of existence. A remorseful Félix since never created another sentimonster while developing feelings for Kagami.

Socqueline Wang
Socqueline Wang (voiced by Ryan Bartley in the English dub) is an old friend and former schoolmate of Marinette. She helps run her family's art store, located in Paris's Chinatown Les Olympiades and lives in the Helsinki Tower with her mother. She is a skilled gymnast, having won the Grand Prix Gymnastics 3 years in a row, as well as a taekwondo practitioner. She is one year older than Marinette, being in her first year of lycée at Lycée Claude-Monet, and it is implied that she helped Marinette deal with Chloé's bullying when they went to school together. She wishes to be like Ladybug and even impersonates her but Ladybug convinces her to stop after telling her of the potential dangers.

As seen later on, she sometimes helps the heroes out if they need something from her family's art store.

Her appearance and personality is based on the old designs of Marinette, and she even makes a reference to her concept self's crush on Félix in her debut episode.

Collège Françoise Dupont students
 Lê Chiến Kim (also Kim Ature and Kim Nguyen) / King Monkey (voiced by Grant George in the English dub, Wataru Komada in the Japanese dub and Alexandre Nguyen in the French version) is a competitive athletic student in Miss Bustier's class. He is best friends with Max and rivals with Alix. His love interest is Ondine, a swimmer. Using the Monkey Miraculous, he can transform into "King Monkey". His weapon is a Ruyi Jingu Bang and his special power "Uproar" lets him create an object to disrupt his opponents' superpowers. His transformation call is "Xuppu, showtime!" His villain form is "Dark Cupid", an evil version of the mythological figure that spreads hate instead of love.
 Alix Kubdel / Bunnyx (voiced by Kira Buckland in the English dub, Yukiko Morishita in the Japanese dub and Adeline Chetail in the French version season 1 and Marie Nonnenmacher season 2) is a tomboyish and competitive student in Miss Bustier's class. She is of Amazigh origin. She is rivals with Kim. On Twitter, Thomas Astruc confirmed that she is aromantic, meaning she does not experience romantic attraction. In the future, she will receive the Rabbit Miraculous to become "Bunnyx". Her future self's weapon is an umbrella and her special power "Burrow" lets her travel through time. Her future self's transformation call is "Fluff, clockwise!" It is revealed that she has informed her father of her future super hero identity. The present Alix has been entrusted with the Dog Miraculous to become Canigirl who helped the heroes take the Rabbit Miraculous back from Monarch and was allowed to keep the latter. Her villain form is "Timebreaker", who can make people disappear by touching them, which gives her the energy to travel through time. She has also teamed up with Lady Wifi, Reflekta, Princess Fragrance and Horrificator. In an earlier concept, Alix was set to appear in a trio with Sabrina and Chloe; intended to be a reference to Clover, Sam and Alex from the French-Canadian animated series Totally Spies!.
 Max Kanté / Pegasus (voiced by Benjamin Diskin in season 1–3 of the English dub, Zeno Robinson in Season 4 of the English dub, Hiroshi Kōsaka in the Japanese dub and Martial Le Minoux in the French version) is a nerdy, intelligent Malian-French student in Miss Bustier's class. He is best friends with Kim, and is the creator of Markov. On Twitter, Thomas Astruc confirmed that he is asexual, meaning he does not experience sexual attraction. Using the Horse Miraculous, he can transform into "Pegasus". His weapon is a horseshoe-shaped boomerang and his special power "Voyage" lets him to open up a portal to teleport to any location. His transformation call is "Kaalki, full gallop!" He is often called on throughout the series. His villain form is "Gamer", who has a real-life mecha that can upgrade itself if enough people are disintegrated. In one episode, he is upgraded into "Gamer 2.0", who brings a tournament game to life where the players play as any of the akumatized villains, and in the Miraculous Rise of the Sphinx video game, he becomes "Gamer 3.0", where he asks questions from the heroes.
 Markov (voiced by Grant George in the English dub and Alexandre Nguyen in the French version) is a small, flying robot created by Max. He is highly intelligent and capable of experiencing human emotions. His villain form is "Robostus", who can bring mechanical devices to life. He is the first villain to successfully turn against Hawk Moth. In another episode, he is hacked and his powers are modified so that he can brainwash people into giving up their prized possessions.
 Mylène Haprèle / Polymouse (voiced by Jessica Gee-George in the English dub, Arisa Sakuraba in the Japanese dub and Jessie Lambotte in the French version) is a meek and cordial student in Miss Bustier's class. She is an activist and also Ivan's love interest. Using the Mouse Miraculous, she can transform into "Polymouse". Her weapon is a jump rope and her special power Multitude allows her to simultaneously duplicate and shrink herself. Polymouse's transformation call is "Mullo, get squeaky". She is often called upon throughout the series. Her villain form is "Horrificator", a slimy monster that can grow bigger by feeding on people's fear. She has also teamed up with Lady Wifi, Reflekta, Princess Fragrance and Timebreaker as the Gang of Secrets.
 Ivan Bruel / Minotaurox (voiced by Max Mittelman in season 2 in the English dub, Takehiro Hasu in the Japanese dub and Franck Tordjman in the French version) is an imposing yet kind student in Miss Bustier's class. Using the Ox Miraculous, he can transform into "Minotaurox". His weapon is a hammer and his special power Resistance renders him invulnerable to physical attacks and other superpowers. His transformation call is "Stompp, make way". His villain form is "Stoneheart", a giant rock monster who grows bigger whenever he is hit.
 Sabrina Raincomprix / Miss Hound (voiced by Marieve Herington in season 1 of the English dub, Cassandra Lee Morris in season 2–3, Lauren Landa in season 4 onward of the English dub, Miyuki Kobori in the Japanese dub and Marie Nonnenmacher in the French version) is Chloé's best friend and personal assistant, who is treated as a slave. She sometimes uses the Dog Miraculous to transform into "Miss Hound". Her transformation phrase is "Barkk, on the hunt." Her weapon is a ball and her special power Fetch allows her to transport any object that has come into contact with her ball into her possession. Her main villain form is "Vanisher", who is completely invisible. She has also been akumatized into "Miraculer", who can steal the heroes' powers to use for herself. In an earlier concept, Sabrina was set to appear in a trio with Chloé and Alix; intended to be a reference to Clover, Sam and Alex from the French-Canadian animated series Totally Spies!.
 Juleka Couffaine / Purple Tigress (voiced by Erin Fitzgerald in Season 1 of the English dub, Reba Buhr from Season 2 in the English dub, Mariko Honda in the Japanese dub and Marie Nonnenmacher in the French version) is a quiet and reserved student in Bustier's class. She dresses in goth fashion, and is the twin sister of Luka Couffaine. She is best friends with Rose Lavillant, although it is heavily implied that they are in a romantic relationship. She sometimes uses the Tiger Miraculous to transform into "Purple Tigress". Her weapon is a bola whip and her special power "Clout" allows her to channel her energy into an extremely powerful punch. Her transformation call is "Roaar, stripes on". She is often called upon throughout the series. Her main villain form is "Reflekta", who can make people look exactly like her with her mirror beams mounted on her wrists. She has been akumatized into this form multiple times, sometimes teamed up with Lady Wifi and Princess Fragrance and once with Horrificator and Timebreaker. She has been given two sentimonsters.
 Rose Lavillant / Pigella (voiced by Erin Fitzgerald in Season 1 in the English dub, Reba Buhr from Season 2 in the English dub, Mariko Honda in the Japanese dub and Jessie Lambotte in the French version) is a kind and bubbly student in Bustier's class. She is best friends with Juleka Couffaine, although it is heavily implied that they are in a romantic relationship. She also suffers from an unknown chronic illness. She sometimes uses the Pig Miraculous to transform into "Pigella". Her weapon is a tambourine and her special power "Gift" creates a gift box that opens to reveal an image of the target's deepest wish. Her transformation call is "Daizzi, rejoice!". She is often called upon throughout the series. Her villain form is "Princess Fragrance", who can brainwash people with her perfume. She has sometimes teamed up with Lady Wifi and Reflekta, and once with Horrificator and Timebreaker to form the Gang of Secrets.
 Zoé Lee / Vesperia (voiced by Deneen Melody in the English dub, Megumi Nakamura in the Japanese dub and Fily Keita in the French version) is Chloé's maternal half-sister from New York. Unlike Chloé, Zoé is naturally kind and gets along with the students of Miss Bustier's class. Initially, she pretends to be mean and self-centered like her sister in order to be accepted by her family, although she ultimately chooses to be her own person. Using the Bee Miraculous, she can transform into "Vesperia", with the same abilities as Queen Bee. She is often called upon as part of the Miraculous team, acting as the successor for Queen Bee. She was also temporarily chosen as the cat miraculous holder and used it to transform into the superhero “Kitty Noire”. Her villain form is "Sole Crusher", who can grow bigger by stepping on people.
 Nathaniel Kurtzberg / Caprikid (voiced by Michael Sinterniklaas in the English dub, Hiroshi Kōsaka in the Japanese dub and by Franck Tordjman in the French version) is a shy, Jewish-French comic book artist in Miss Bustier's class. His first name is a homage to Nathanaël Bronn, the chief art director of the series, while his last name is a homage to famous comic book artist Jack Kirby, who was born as Jacob Kurtzberg. He is in a relationship with Marc Anciel. Using the Goat Miraculous, he can transform into "Caprikid". His transformation phrase is "Ziggy, bleat it". His weapon is a paintbrush staff and his special power Genesis allows him to create any mundune object he can imagine. His villain form is "Evillustrator", an artist who can draw and erase things in real life with his graphics tablet.
 Marc Anciel / Rooster Bold (voiced by Kyle McCarley in the English dub, Takuma Sasaki in the Japanese dub and Alexandre Nguyen in the French version) is a shy writer who is a student at Collège Françoise Dupont. According to Thomas Astruc and Feri González, Marc is based upon Hope Morphin, a personal friend of Astruc who is both genderfluid and bisexual, and that Marc also identifies as part of the LGBT community. He and Nathaniel collaborate on writing a comic book. Using the Rooster Miraculous, he can transform into "Rooster Bold". His transformation phrase is "Orikko, sunrise". His weapon is a quill and his special power Sublimation gives him any special ability he wants. His villain form is "Reverser", who can reverse any of his victims' personality traits while flying on a paper plane-type mode of transportation.
 Aurore Beauréal (voiced by Mela Lee in the English dub, Rika Morinaga in the Japanese dub, Geneviève Doang in season one of the French version and Marie Nonnenmacher in season 2-Present in the French version) is a student in Ms. Mendeleiev's class and an aspiring weathergirl, often seen with her parasol. Her villain form is "Stormy Weather", who can control the weather. In one episode, she is upgraded into "Stormy Weather 2.0" where she can now control all the forces of nature.

Collège François Dupont faculty
 Caline Bustier (voiced by Dorothy Elias-Fahn in the English dub and Jessie Lambotte in the French version) is the teacher for Marinette and Adrien's class at Collège François Dupont who teaches French, poetry, and literature. In the Miraculous World: New York special, she is revealed to be pregnant. Her villain form is "Zombizou", a zombie-like person who can spread a zombie-like infection through kissing.
 Mr. Damocles (voiced by J.C. Hyke in the English dub, Shinoosuke Ogami in the Japanese dub and Gilbert Lévy in the French version) is the principal of Collège François Dupont. He also roleplays as a superhero called "The Owl" and is a fan of American superhero Knightowl. His often clumsy attempts to do good are often played for comic relief. His villain form is the "Dark Owl", an owl-themed supervillain with real gadgets and tools that are summoned to him after his computer A.I. Albert is also akumatized. He was also akumatized into an upgraded version of Dark Owl called "Darker Owl" with the power of the Pig Miraculous.
 Ms. Mendeleiev (voiced by Philece Sampler in season one-four of the English dub and Marie Chevalot in the French version) is a teacher at Collège François Dupont who teaches science, math, and physics. She is shown to be stricter and less kind than Miss Bustier. Her surname resembles Dmitri Mendeleev, the creator of the modern periodic table of elements. Her villain form is "Kwamibuster", who can use a special vacuum to capture the kwamis and wishes to prove their existence.
 Armand D'Argencourt (voiced by Joe Fria in the English dub and Thierry Kazazian in the French version) is the gym teacher of Collège Françoise Dupont who also teaches fencing. He is the descendant of the warrior Darkblade, who once ruled over all of France. Armand is also a former mayoral candidate, although his campaign lost miserably to Mayor Bourgeois. His villain form is "Darkblade", a knight who can turn people into knights that obey his every command.
 Fred Haprèle (voiced by Ezra Weisz in the English dub and Franck Tordjman in the French version) is a part-time assistant teacher at Collège Françoise Dupont, an expert mime artist, and the father of Mylène. His villain form is "The Mime", a mime who can bring anything he gestures to life. Notably, The Mime is one of the first villains ever conceived for the Miraculous series, appearing in the animated test short "Ladybug PV" alongside Mr. Pigeon and Hawk Moth.

Kwamis
Kwamis are fairy-like divine beings, personifications of abstract concepts with animal-like features bound to the Miraculouses. Kwamis use the Miraculouses to transform their holders into animal-themed super beings with a fraction of their full power. While having a desire to do good, some kwamis like Nooroo and Duusu end up being used by villainous holders and are forced to aid them.

When Monarch got ahold of most of the Chinese Miraculous, they were converted into special smart rings so that Monarch can make use of the Kwamis' abilities and even upload them to his akumatized villains.

If a holder does not wish to use a kwami, they can renounce it.

Chinese Miraculous Box Kwamis
The following Kwamis are associated with the Chinese Miraculous Box:

 Wayzz (voiced by Christopher Corey Smith in the English dub, Wataru Komada in the Japanese dub and Franck Tordjman in the French version) is the kwami of Protection, bound to the Turtle Miraculous, a bracelet.
 Nooroo (voiced by Ben Diskin in the English dub, Mariko Honda in the Japanese dub and Martial Le Minoux in the French version) is the kwami of Transmission, bound to the Butterfly Miraculous, a brooch.
 Trixx (voiced by Cherami Leigh in the English dub, Miyuki Koboki in the Japanese dub and Franck Tordjman in the French version) is the kwami of Illusion, bound to the Fox Miraculous, a necklace. He can use his Mirage power without a holder, but it is unrestrained.
 Pollen (voiced by Cassandra Lee Morris in Seasons 2–3, Lauren Landa in Season 4 onward) in the English dub, Yukiko Aruga in the Japanese dub and Clara Soares in the French version) is the kwami of Action (also "Subjection"), bound to the Bee Miraculous, a hair comb.
 Duusu (voiced by Melissa Fahn in the English dub, Airi Otsu in the Japanese dub and Fanny Bloc in the French version) is the kwami of Emotion, bound to the Peacock Miraculous, a brooch. Due to the Peacock Miraculous being damaged, Duusu acts sporadically, often quickly switching between being happy and sad. When the Peacock Miraculous is repaired, she returns to normal, remarking that there was "chaos in [her] head".

In addition to these, there are also twelve kwamis based on the animals of the Chinese zodiac.

 Mullo (voiced by Deneen Melody in the English dub) is the kwami of Multiplication, bound to the Mouse Miraculous, a pendant necklace.
 Stompp (voiced by Thierry Kazazian in the French version and Lauren Landa in Season 3 onward in the English dub) is the kwami of Determination, bound to the Ox Miraculous, a nose ring. His power manifests as Resistance, that makes the user invulnerable to physical attacks and other superpowers.
 Roaar (voiced by Sandy Fox in Seasons 3-4 in the English dub and Caroline Combes in the French version) is the kwami of Elation, bound to the Tiger Miraculous, a panjas bracelet.
 Fluff (voiced by Ryan Bartley in Seasons 3–4 in the English dub, Aya Kawakami in the Japanese dub and Céline Melloul the French version) is the kwami of Evolution, bound to the Rabbit Miraculous, a pocket watch. She appears to be a reference to the White Rabbit from Alice's Adventures in Wonderland, who also carries a pocket watch and obsesses over being late.
 Longg (voiced by Masashi Nogawa in the Japanese dub, Grant George in the English dub and Marie Nonnenmacher in the French version) is the kwami of Perfection, bound to the Dragon Miraculous, a beaded choker. His power manifests as elemental shapeshifting, allowing his holder to transform into wind, water or lightning.
 Sass (voiced by Ben Diskin in the English dub, Masaya Fukunishi in the Japanese dub and Alexandre Nguyen in the French version) is the kwami of Intuition, bound to the Snake Miraculous, an ouroboros bracelet. He can use his Second Chance without a holder to go back to any time of his choosing, but he will cause things from other times to end up in the present, and mess up clocks and other timing systems.
 Kaalki (voiced by Deneen Melody in Seasons 3–4 in the English dub, Airi Otsu in the Japanese dub and Fanny Bloc in the French version) is the kwami of Migration (also "Teleportation"), bound to the Horse Miraculous, a pair of glasses. She can use her Voyage without a holder, but it sends nearby things to random locations.
 Ziggy (voiced by Susannah Corrington in the English dub and Céline Melloul in the French version) is the kwami of Passion, bound to the Goat Miraculous, a pair of hair clips.
 Xuppu (voiced by Sarah Weisz in the English dub, Eiko Hanawa in the Japanese dub and Franck Tordjman in the French version) is the kwami of Derision, bound to the Monkey Miraculous, a circlet.
 Orikko (voiced by Sabrina Weisz in the English dub) is the kwami of Pretension, bound to the Rooster Miraculous, a thumb ring.
 Barkk (voiced by Sabrina Glow in Season 4 in the English dub and Jessie Lambotte in the French version) is the kwami of Adoration, bound to the Dog Miraculous, a collar necklace.
 Daizzi (voiced by Jessica Gee-George in the English dub and Tony Marot in the French version) is the kwami of Jubilation, bound to the Pig Miraculous, a pearl anklet.

Native American Kwamis 
The following Kwamis are associated with the Native American Miraculous box that appeared in Miraculous New York:

 Liiri (voiced by Cedric Williams in the English dub) is the Kwami of Liberation, bound to the Eagle Miraculous, a talon pendant. His power manifests as "Liberation", allowing the user to free anyone of that person's mental restraints. He once belonged to Gilbert du Motier but ended up in the hands of Gabriel Agreste after he stole the Eagle Miraculous. It later ended up with Jessica Keynes. 
Other known but currently unnamed Kwamis: Bear Kwami, Beaver Kwami, Deer Kwami, Falcon Kwami, Goose Kwami, Otter Kwami, Owl Kwami, Raven Kwami, Salmon Kwami, Thunderbird Kwami, Wolf Kwami, and Woodpecker Kwami.

Citizens
 Emilie Agreste is the wife of Gabriel Agreste and the mother of Adrien, along with being Amelie Graham de Vanily's twin sister. While publicly declared deceased, Emilie is in a comatose state and kept in glass coffin located in a repository in the Agrestes' basement. She is also a former actress, having appeared in the film Solitude in the leading role. She aided Gabriel in finding the Miraculous and received the Peacock Miraculous from him, the use of the damaged Miraculous being the direct cause of her current condition. The fifth season also revealed that Emilie left a series of video logs prior to her coma that detail her concern for Gabriel's growing obsession with the Miraculous and her request for Nathalie to look after Adrien for her.
 André Bourgeois (voiced by Joe Ochman in the English dub, Kenta Sasa in the Japanese dub and Gilbert Lévy in the French version) is the Mayor of Paris, Chloé's father, and the owner of the Le Grand Paris luxury hotel. He is prone to getting angry at anyone who wrongs his daughter and unprofessionally jumps to conclusions. Despite this, Mayor Bourgeois tends to learn from his mistakes and make things right for those he had wronged. He used to be a filmmaker but eventually gave up his directing and moved into politics to better provide for his family. His main villain form is "Malediktator", a dictator who can compel people into doing exactly what he declares. He has also been fused with Audrey as "Heart Hunter", a two-faced floating head that consumes love.
 Audrey Bourgeois (voiced by Haviland Stillwell in the English dub and Céline Melloul in the French version) is Chloé's and Zoé's mother, and a world-renowned fashion designer who owns Style Queen Magazine. She acts distantly to Chloé and often fires her subordinates. She has a close relationship with Gabriel Agreste, claiming that she discovered and popularized his designs. Her villain form is "Style Queen", a regenerative being of glitter that can turn people into glitter statues; however, in one episode, her victims turn into glitter piles. She has also become Heart Hunter with André.
 Butler Jean (voiced by Benjamin Diskin in the English dub and Martial le Minoux in the French version) is a butler employed at the Le Grand Paris hotel. He is usually seen serving Chloé and her family; she constantly mistreats him and addresses him with different names (e.g. Jean-Paul, Jean-Eudes, and Jean-Pierre); his real last name is thus unknown. His villain form is "Despair Bear", a small supervillain who controls a teddy bear from the inside and can mind control anyone he touches.
 Alec Cataldi (voiced by Andre Gordon in the English dub and Masaaki Yano in the Japanese dub) is a TV host who hosts different shows. Due to childhood bullying, he is typically insensitive and unkind towards others, often contributing to them being akumatized. However, he gets over this, wishing to inspire people and dressing in drag. His villain form is "Wishmaker", who can make people turn into their childhood dreams, albeit unwillingly.
 Jagged Stone (voiced by Lex Lang in the English dub, Yuki Arai in the Japanese dub and Matthew Gèczy in the French version) is a popular rock star heavily admired by Marinette and her peers. He is Luka and Juleka's father, and originally had a band named "Croco Duo" with their mother Anarka, but left both his family and band to pursue a solo career. He has a pet crocodile named Fang. His villain form is "Guitar Villain", who is able to cast different spells by playing his guitar. In this form, Fang also turns into a crocodile/dragon hybrid who serves as Guitar Villain's mode of transportation.
 Penny Rolling (voiced by Mela Lee in the English dub and by Anne-Charlotte Piau in the French version) is Jagged Stone's agent and assistant. She appears to have romantic feelings for Jagged, but it is unknown if they are reciprocated. Her villain form is "Troublemaker", who can switch between tangible and intangible by the clicking of her pen. In the Miraculous: Rise of the Sphinx video game, she has been akumatized into "Soundwave" who can generate harmful soundwaves.
 Bob Roth (voiced by Grant George in the English dub and by Gilbert Lévy in the French version) is a music producer and the owner of a record company named after himself (Bob Roth Records). He is very greedy and selfish. Roth does a lot of projects to earn more money, and is willing to fire any person if they don't bring him financial success, as shown in several episodes. He was also formerly the record producer for Jagged Stone. Roth has also directed films and commercials and wishes to build a theme park featuring cloned dinosaurs. His villain form is "Moolak", who can turn people into coins that wears a large golden safe-like armor that is usually filled with coins. Moolak's name is a play on the word "moolah", meaning "money".
 Xavier-Yves "XY" Roth (voiced by Benjamin Diskin in the English dub and by Alexandre Nguyen in the French version) is a pop star who is the son of Bob Roth. In "Guitar Villain", XY is targeted by the titular villain. In "Kwamibuster", he appears as an expert on Alternative Truth.
 Vincent Aza (voiced by Matthew Mercer in the English dub, Yuuji Murai in the Japanese dub and Franck Tordjman in the French version) is a skilled photographer. He is an obsessive fan of Jagged Stone, following him everywhere he goes and holding a personal shrine for him in his room. His villain form is "Pixelator", a photographer who can trap the people he takes pictures of in photographs.
 Vivica (voiced by Morgan Berry in the English dub) is a professional guitarist working for Jagged Stone. She was based on a real person named Vivica, who won a contest at the Miraculous panel at L.A. Comic Con 2016. She was supposed to be a veterinarian, but it was changed. Her villain form is "Desperada", a Calaca-themed villain who can create instrument-themed weapons that she claims never miss their target.
 Théo Barbot (voiced by Brian Beacock in the English dub, Tomoyuki Maruyama in the Japanese dub and Franck Tordjman in the French version) is an artist and sculptor that lives in Paris. He is responsible for constructing the Ladybug and Cat Noir sculpture in the Place des Voyages and has a crush on Ladybug, although he later gets over this. He has also made several cameo appearances with random jobs. His villain form is "Copycat", an exact copy of Cat Noir.
 Simon Grimault (voiced by Ezra Weisz in the English dub and Franck Tordjman in the French version) is a hypnotist who utilizes cards. His villain form is "Simon Says", a hypnotist who can hypnotize people into adopting the traits of the objects that appear on his cards.
 Nadja Chamack (voiced by Sabrina Weisz in the English dub and Jessie Lambotte in the French version) is a TVi news reporter and Manon's mother. Her catchphrase is "Don't be bemused, it's just the news". Her villain form is "Prime Queen", who can teleport through digital screens. During the "Heroes Day" episodes, Prime Queen also controlled video drones to help with Scarlet Moth's broadcast.
 Manon Chamack (voiced by Stephanie Sheh in the English dub, Miyuki Kobori in the Japanese dub and Marie Nonnenmacher in the French version) is a little girl and Nadja's daughter who Marinette often babysits. She is depicted as being quite bratty and usually causes trouble for Marinette while she babysits her. Her villain form is "The Puppeteer", who uses a wand and can control the people her dolls are based on. In one episode, she is upgraded into Puppeteer 2.0 and given the ability to animate the wax statues at the Musée Grevin.
 Roger Raincomprix (voiced by Christopher Corey Smith in the English dub, Shinnosuke Ogami in the Japanese dub and Martial Le Minoux in the French version) is a police officer and Sabrina's father who works to uphold the law in Paris. His villain form is "Rogercop", an armored police officer who can force people to enact whatever "sentences" he orders.
 Alim Kubdel (voiced by Todd Haberkorn in the English dub and by Philippe Roullier in French version) is the father of Alix and Jalil and the manager of Louvre. In "Timebreaker", he gave Alix a pocket watch which later revealed to be the Rabbit Miraculous in camouflage mode. In season 5, it is revealed that he knew all along that his daughter would eventually become a superhero and that he has been preparing her for the day Ladybug would seek her help.
 Jalil Kubdel (voiced by Vic Mignogna in season one of the English dub and by Franck Tordjman in the French version) is Alix's older brother. He is a young historian and presumably works at the Louvre alongside his father Alim. His villain form is "The Pharaoh", who has powers related to the Egyptian gods like making time-slowing bubbles associated with Thoth, gaining super-strength from Sekhmet, turning people into mummies that obey his every command through Anubis, and gaining flight from Horus. During season five when Jalil allows himself to be akumatized into Pharaoh again so that he can see if Ladybug is a villain and know if Alix didn't leave on her own, he once used the power of the Turtle Miraculous and now possessed Maat's Book of Truth. When Jalil got confirmation from Ma'at's Book of Truth that Ladybug was right about not being a villain and that Alix left on her own accord, Jalil learned that Monarch lied and broke free from his control.
 Xavier Ramier (voiced by Todd Haberkorn in the English dub and by Franck Tordjman in the French dub) is a man who loves pigeons, to the point of acting like them. He is known for feeding pigeons in parks despite it being illegal, earning him the ire of Officer Raincomprix and other people. His villain form is "Mr. Pigeon", who can control massive flocks of pigeons. He later gains the ability to turn people into pigeons, and in the Miraculous: Rise of the Sphinx video game, gained the ability to turn pigeons into robots. A running gag establishes that he is constantly akumatized due to the mistreatment of pigeons in Paris. Before he receives his Magical Charm, he has become Mr. Pigeon seventy-two times. Alongside Hawk Moth and The Mime, Mr. Pigeon is one of the first villains to be created for the series, appearing in the animated test short "Ladybug PV".
 Otis Césaire (voiced by Paul St. Peter in the English dub and by Éric Peter in the French version) is the zookeeper at the Ménagerie du Jardin des Plantes and the father of Alya. His villain form is "Animan", who can transform into any animal that is either living or extinct.
 Marlena Césaire (voiced by Erin Fitzgerald in the English dub and by Céline Melloul in the French version) is the head chef of Le Grand Paris' restaurant and the mother of Alya.
 Nora Césaire (voiced by Laila Berzins in the English dub and by Nathalie Homs in the French version) is a kickboxer who is the older sister of Alya. Her villain form is "Anansi", a spider-like villain who has six arms and can shoot spider webs.
 Ella & Etta Cesaire (both voiced by Cherami Leigh in the English dub and by Marie Nonnenmacher and Jessie Lambotte in the French version) are the younger twin sisters of Alya Césaire, who are both often causing chaos and mayhem. Their villain form is "Sapotis", a pair of gremlins who multiply whenever they eat.
 Mr. Banana (voiced by Bryce Papenbrook in the English dub of "Kwamibuster" and "Party Crasher", Ezra Weisz in the English dub of Season 4) is a mascot in Paris who resembles a banana with yellow and green skin-tight leggings and yellow crocks. The person who wears the costume is unknown and his catchphrase is "Stay peachy".
 Wang Cheng (voiced by Todd Haberkorn in the English dub and by Bing Yin in the French version) is Marinette's maternal great-uncle and Sabine's childhood guardian. He is a world-renowned chef, owning a popular restaurant in Shanghai, and is known for improvising a new ingredient with every dish. His villain form is "Kung Food", a chef who can summon food-themed weapons from his bag.
 Wayhem (voiced by Chris Hackney in the English dub and by Tony Marot in the French version) is a teenager living in Paris. He is an obsessive fan of Adrien, although eventually he tones his behavior down and becomes more friendly to him. His villain form is "Party Crasher", a party-themed villain who can trap anyone in his disco balls and predict his opponents' movements.
 Gina Dupain (voiced by Reba Buhr in the English dub, Kazue Ikura in the Japanese dub and by Marie Chevalot in the French version) is Marinette's Italian grandmother from Tom's side of the family. She is adventurous and free-spirited, having apparently travelled the world prior to the series. She is wearing a T-shirt with a print that is an allusion to The Dark Side of the Moon musical album by Pink Floyd. Her villain form is "Befana"; based on the Italian folkloric figure, she has a flying motorcycle and the ability to turn people into coal statues or fairy servants. She has also teamed up with Qilin, Weredad, and Bakerix to form the Dearest Family.
 Rolland Dupain (voiced by Paul St. Peter in the English dub and by Martial Le Minoux in the French version) is Marinette's estranged grandfather from Tom's side of the family. Like his son, he is a skilled baker and is obsessed with tradition, often proclaiming "That's not how it's done!" whenever seeing something untraditional. As such, he had a falling out with his son when he married Sabine, but eventually comes around and reunites with his family with help from Marinette. His main villain form is "Bakerix", a bread-themed Gaul who can grow by drinking yeast, who has teamed up with Qilin, Weredad, and Befana to form the Dearest Family. He has also become "Simpleman", who can make people think and act like children by using his peel.
 André (voiced by Ezra Weisz in the English dub and Philippe Roullier in the French version) is a friendly ice cream vendor, claiming that his ice cream can make any couple who eats it fall in love forever. He was a former office worker before he had a change of occupation. His villain form is "Glaciator", a giant snowman made of ice cream who can turn people into ice cream and he has once used the power of the Tiger Miraculous.
 August (voiced by Grant George in the English dub and Caroline Combes in the French version) is a baby boy who just wants a lollipop, but isn't allowed to by his mother because he's too young. His villain form is "Gigantitan", a giant version of himself.
 Ondine (voiced by Erika Harlacher in the English dub, Yukiko Aruga in the Japanese dub and Clara Soares in the French version) is a swimming student, often seen at the pool alongside Lê Chiến Kim. She is shown to have a crush on Kim, despite his obliviousness to it the two eventually begin a relationship. Her villain form is "Syren", an aquatic villain with flipper-like feet who floods Paris with her tears.
 Anarka Couffaine (voiced by Laura Préjean in the French version) is the mother of Juleka and Luka who lives on a houseboat called The Liberty. Her villain form is "Captain Hardrock", a pirate whose houseboat becomes a living pirate ship with weapons. While her ship was originally confined to the water, it later gains the ability to fly.
 Philippe (voiced by Joe Fria in the English dub and Philippe Candeloro in the French version) is a talented figure skating trainer who runs an ice rink in Paris. He is based on and named after his French voice actor, the real-life figure skater Philippe Candeloro; he claims his three daughters are named Luna, Maya, and Thalia, who are Candeloro's own daughters in real life. His villain form is "Frozer", an ice skater who can produce ice from his ice skates.
 Marianne Lenoir (voiced by Barbara Goodson in the English dub and Virginie Ledieu in the French version) is an old companion and lover of Master Fu, whom he parted ways with during World War II. She is eventually able to reunite with him, although they decide to remain apart after Hawk Moth learns of their association. After Fu renounces guardianship of the Miracle Box to Ladybug and loses his memories, she returns and takes him away from Paris. She is later revealed to have married Fu. Her villain form is the clock-like "Backwarder" who can make people perform their actions in reverse.
 Thomas Astruc (voiced by Jason Marnocha in the English version and Thomas Astruc in the French version) is a movie director responsible for directing the in-universe animated film Les aventures de Ladybug & Chat Noir. He is based upon the real Thomas Astruc, who created the series. His villain form is "Animaestro", who can transform into any animated character imaginable.
 Chris Lahiffe (voiced by Alejandro Saab in the English dub) is the younger brother of Nino. His villain form is "Christmaster", who can control giant, living toys with help from his snowglobe. In the future, he will be turned into the graffiti artist "Timetagger" whose spray paint has the power to send people through time. The future Hawk Moth - who isn't Gabriel - will use him to obtain the heroes' Miraculouses before they become adults.
 Claudie Kanté (voiced by Laura Préjean in the French version) is Max's mother. She is the conductor of the Startrain, although has ambitions to become an astronaut, which she eventually succeeds in. Her villain form is "Startrain", the conductor of a space-faring train who can manipulate all of its systems. She is the first and so far the only villain to act entirely to her own accord since Hawk Moth lost track of the akuma.
 Tomoe Tsurugi (voiced by Minae Noji in the English dub and Frédérique Marlot in the French version) is Kagami's overprotective mother and a world renowned fencer. She is business partners and friends with Gabriel Agreste, and like him, is very strict with her daughter, although occasionally allows her more freedom. She is the only character in the series to be blind, and is seen wearing black sunglasses and using a kendo sword as a walking stick, while using self-driving voice activated car named Tatsu. In season 5, she enters a partnership with Gabriel to create Alliance Rings that allows Monarch to channel the power of the Miraculous to those villains wearing them and she was its first test subject. Her villain form is "Ikari Gozen", a giant samurai-armored centaur fused with Tatsu who wields a giant bokken and the ability to trap people inside her stomach. When Tomoe used the prototype of the Alliance Ring as Ikari Gozen, she possessed the abilities of the Mouse Miraculous. She has been upgraded into "Matagi Gozen", an archer who this time is not bound to her steed and has been granted the powers of the Bee, Horse, Mouse, and Rooster Miraculouses.
 Amelie Graham de Vanily (voiced by Laura Post in the English dub and by Jeanne Chartier in French version) is the mother of Felix, Emilie's sister, and Adrien's aunt. Unlike his son who has become bitter with the Agrestes, Amelie is kind and friendly with them. However, she has tried to convince Gabriel to give her the Graham twin rings back, which are family heirlooms used as wedding rings for Emilie and Gabriel. After Felix stole Gabriel's ring, she believed that Gabriel gave it back.
 Grand Master Su-Han (voiced by Kaiji Tang in the English dub and by Gauthier Battoue in the French version) is the leader of the Order of Guardians, Master Fu's former teacher, and the former protector of the Chinese Miracle Box (which he calls the "Mother Box"). He and the rest of the Guardians were trapped by Fu's sentimonster prior to the series, but after they were freed, he travels to Paris to recover the Miracle Box. He follows a strict code of rules and, like all Guardians, is trained in a special martial art called "Mirakung Fu" designed to combat rogue Miraculous holders. When he meets Marinette, he at first believes she is unable to be a Guardian, but later approves of her service. He also decides to stay in Paris to learn about the modern world. After Hawk Moth manages to steal most of the Miraculous from Ladybug with help from Felix, Su-Han scolded Ladybug for her failure leading to an argument with Ladybug and Cat Noir who remind him that he only scolded them unnecessarily since his arrival. After a brief breakdown and an apology, he noted that he is still not used to the modern world. Su-Han tells Ladybug and Cat Noir that he is heading back to the temple to get some reinforcements.
 Harry Clown (voiced by Benjamin Diskin in the English dub and Franck Dubosc in the French version) is a comedian who is known for wearing a clown nose and has been wanting to do a non-comedic movie much to the objection of Bob Roth. His design is based on French comedian Franck Dubosc. His villain form is "Psycomedian", a jester who can force people to feel particular emotions.
 Didier Roustan (voiced by Christopher Corey Smith in the English and by Didier Roustan in French version) is a sports coach and journalist who teaches Miss Bustier's class to play football in "Penalteam". He is based on the real life French sports journalist Didier Roustan.
 Froggy (voiced by Mela Lee in the English dub) is a young boy who likes frogs and rides a tricycle. His villain form is "Risk", a frog-themed villain who can make people more reckless.
 Veronique (voiced by Laura Post in English dub) is the curator of the Musée Grévin. When Mayor Bourgeois objects to having a section for the temporary heroes opened and threatening to close the museum, Veronique is akumatized by Monarch into "Manipula", a wax-themed villain who can control wax statues that get her special paper placed on their foreheads. Monarch even enhanced her with powers from the Ox Miraculous. After Manipula was defeated, Ladybug convinced Mayor Bourgeois to let Veronique keep her museum and its temporary heroes section open.

Sentimonsters
A Sentimonster is a living being that can be manifested from the emotions of the holder of the Peacock Miraculous when they turn a feather into an amok, their form and abilities dependent on the wielder's imagination with some gaining free will when they a hold of their amok. They can also be akumatized. The sentimonsters can be destroyed by either destroying the amokized object or at will by the wielder of the Peacock quoting "I release you from your existence". While the previous users of the Peacock Miraculous see the Sentimonsters as disposable tools, the user holder Félix began to see them as living beings.

Notable sentimonsters include:

 A giant butterfly sentimonster created twice by Mayura.
 Reflekdoll - A doll-themed sentimonster resembling Reflekta that can turn people into copies of her.
 Lollipop Boy - A recurring sentimonster made of giant lollipops.
 Master Fu's sentimonster which was petrified and became an exhibit at the Louvre. Hawk Moth named it Feast after akumatizing it.
 Sentimonster copies of Ladybug, Gabriel, Alec, Nino, and the Bubbler. They are voiced by their respective voice actors.
 Light Eye - Truth's Sentimonster that freezes his victims in place.
 Banana Boom-Boom - Queen Banana's gorilla/banana sentimonster that turns people into bananas.
 Mega Leech - Malediktator's Sentimonster that splits him into tiny clones.
 Guiltrip - Another Sentimonster of Reflekta that amplifies people's guilt.
 Optigami - A spy camera sentimonster that Gabriel and Nathalie use to track the heroes.
 Hack-San - A flash drive with a computer virus that was used to hack Markov.
 Kuro Neko (voiced by Deneen Melody in the English dub) - A giant cat/piggy bank-themed Sentimonster given to a young girl named Rhythm whose cat was missing.
 Strikeback - An armored giant capable of copying any power used against it.
 Sphinx - The titular sentimonster and final boss of the Miraculous: Rise of the Sphinx video game. It was created by Mayura, initially a caterpillar feeding and growing on negative emotions, it eventually becomes a butterfly capable of spreading a powder that causes people to experience negative emotions.
 Red Moon - A moon-like sentimonster created by Argos capable of erasing people from existence.

Appearing in Miraculous World
The following characters appear in the Miraculous World films:

New York
 United Heroez - A superhero team based in New York City. They appear in the Miraculous New York special.
 Olympia Hill / Majestia (voiced by Anairis Quiñones in the English dub) - is the leader of the United Heroez. She is kind and compassionate, and one of the most powerful heroes in the United States, possessing unrivaled strength, invulnerability, and flight. She is the creator and mother of Uncanny Valley, and is engaged in a relationship with Barbara Keynes/Knightowl. She has a sister named Ignoblia who will be a future enemy of Ladybug and Cat Noir. She is described by Thomas Astruc as a "fusion between Superman and Wonder Woman", and her design resembles the likes of Power Girl, Supergirl and Carol Danvers.
 Barbara Keynes / Knightowl (voiced by Anairis Quiñones when unmasked in the English dub, Imari Williams when masked in the English dub) is an owl-themed superhero and a member of the United Heroez who Mr. Damocles is a fan of. She is very strict and follows a tight code of ethics, growing frustrated with anyone who breaks her rules or doesn't appear to take superheroics seriously, like Ladybug and Cat Noir, and even her daughter, Jessica Keynes/Sparrow. Even so, she is able to respect those that prove themselves, allowing Sparrow to have more independence when she becomes Eagle. She is engaged in a relationship with Olympia Hill/Majestia. As revealed towards the end of the special, Barbara is actually the latest incarnation of Knightowl, as the mantle has been passed down for generations (it is implied that she was the Sparrow for the previous Knightowl), and as such disguises her gender while in-costume. Her costume and demeanor is presumably based upon Batman, while her civilian design is modeled off of Marinette Dupain-Cheng/Ladybug's English voice actor Cristina Vee.
 Jessica Keynes / Sparrow / Eagle (voiced by Jaimi Gray as Jessica in the English dub, Scott Whyte when masked in the English dub) is the daughter of Knightowl. She is Knightowl's sidekick, although desires to be treated as a proper heroine. After receiving the Eagle Miraculous, she transforms into the superhero Eagle. Her weapon is a Bullroarer and her special power "Liberation" allows her to free anyone from their self-imposed limitations. Prior to her official debut, a different version of Sparrow was originally conceived as a member of the Quantic Kids, a team of teenage superheroes that Ladybug and Cat Noir were a part of in the early production of the series, although the entire concept was ultimately disregarded. Like how Knightowl is presumably based upon Batman, Sparrow is presumably based upon Batman's sidekick, Robin; specifically, the Dick Grayson incarnation and Eagle is based on Robin's independent superhero persona Nightwing.
 Aeon / Uncanny Valley (voiced by Kimberly Woods in the English dub) is an android superhero that appears in Miraculous New York. She is the creation of Majestia and best friend of Jessica Keynes who is able to fly, fire lasers, and hack into technology.
 Camilla Hombee / Victory (voiced by Laura Stahl in the English dub) is the President of the United States and a patriotic superhero who is also a member of the United Heroez. She wields a shield, and has access to numerous military weapons hidden across New York City. Her design and use of a shield is presumably based upon Captain America. Her full name is an anagram of Michelle Obama.
 Dean Gate / Doorman (voiced by Alejandro Saab in the English dub) is a superhero who is a member of the United Heroez. He possesses the ability to turn any door into a portal that would connect any location in the world. In his civilian identity, Dean Gate is a professor at Armstrong High School.
 Snowflake
 Hurricane
 Mercury
 Sting
 Thorn
 Agent Red
 Agent Blue
 Agent Yellow
 Mike Rochip / Techno-Pirate (voiced by Kellen Goff in the English dub) is a supervillain that appears in Miraculous New York. He is obsessed with stealing technology, and has superhuman strength and technopathic abilities. His akumatized form is "Techlonizer", who can shut down technology and use its abilities for himself. He later uses the Eagle Miraculous to become "Miraclonizer" where he is able to fly and use its power of Liberation on the United Heroez.
 The unnamed Native American monk (voiced by Grant George in the English dub) is a member of the Order of the Guardians that appeared in Miraculous New York as the guardian of the Native American Miraculous Box. He briefly appears at the end of the special to confront Eagle and Uncanny Valley and reclaim the Eagle Miraculous, but is instead convinced to stay in New York and create a new generation of heroes.

Shanghai
 Fei Wu / Lady Dragon (voiced by Xanthe Huynh in the English dub and Ami Naito in the Japanese dub) is a young martial artist who appears in Miraculous Shanghai. She is the adoptive daughter of Wu Shifu, learning kung fu and values under him in order to become the Guardian of the Sacred Cave. After Shifu is killed and the bracelet that he entrusted Fei with stolen, Fei becomes a thief to pay Cash for information on her father's killer. After meeting Marinette, she renounces this lifestyle. After claiming the Prodigious jewel Shifu was protecting, she transforms into Ladydragon, gaining the ability to see creatures called Renlings, and transform into different animals if she possesses the values they represent. Her transformations include Lady Bear (Calmness), Lady Mantis (Patience), Lady Snake (Courage), Lady Monkey (Compassion), Lady Eagle (Confidence), Lady Horse (Honor), Lady Tiger (Discipline), and finally her dragon form (Justice). After defeating Cash, Fei moves in with Wang Cheng. Lady Dragon is set to return in her own TV series.
 The Renlings are sprite-like beings that appear in Miraculous Shanghai. They are "cousins" to the Kwamis and represent human values. They grant whoever wields the Prodigious the ability to transform into the animals they resemble as long as they possess the values they represent. They consist of the dragon-like Long Long (voiced by Christopher Corey Smith in the English dub) represents Justice, the bear-like Xiong Xiong (voiced by Sabrina Weisz in the English dub) represents Calmness, the mantis-like Tang Tang (voiced by Mela Lee in the English dub) represents Patience, the snake-like She She (voiced by Carrie Keranen in the English dub) represents Courage, the eagle-like Ying Ying represents Confidence, the monkey-like Hou Hou (voiced by Brook Chalmers in the English dub) represents Compassion, the horse-like Ma Ma represents Honor, and the tiger-like Hu Hu represents Discipline.
 Cash (voiced by Caleb Yen in the English dub and Tetsuya Oka in the Japanese dub) is a greedy crime boss who owns a pawn shop in Shanghai. He briefly appears in Miraculous New York and officially debuts in Miraculous Shanghai. Prior to the events of the special, he was responsible for the death of Wu Shifu, the destruction of his school, and stealing Fei's bracelet, which he subsequently sold to Nathalie on behalf of Gabriel. He later has Fei steal for him in return for information about her father's killer. However, Fei eventually leaves him when he tries to make Marinette buy back her own things at his shop. As Ladydragon, she decides to bring Cash to justice. His akumatized form is "King Cash", a golden terracotta man whose hand fan can slice anything with its silver blades and is implied to turn things into gold with its golden blade.
 Mei Shi (voiced by Mark Chen in the English dub) is the lion-like protector of the Prodigious who appears in Miraculous Shanghai. Initially, he appears as a humanoid Chinses guardian lion-like statue, judging whoever claims the Prodigious of their worthiness. Later, he assumes his true form of a small kwami-like creature and begins accompanying Ladydragon. His akumatized form is "YanLuoShi", a red titanic version of himself who has the ability to destroy anything with his lasers. YanLuoShi is the second akumatized villain to act against Hawk Moth.

Notes

References

Bibliography
 Miraculous: Tales of Ladybug and Cat Noir. Authored by Jeremy Zag, Thomas Astruc, Fred Lenoir, Sebastien Thibaudeau, Matthieu Choquet, Nicole D'Andria, Cheryl Black. Published by Action Lab Entertainment, Inc., 2016. 
 Miraculous: Tales of Ladybug and Cat Noir: Spots on. Authored by Jeremy Zag, Thomas Astruc, Sebastien Thibaudeau, Denis Bardiau, Guillaume Mautalent, Sebastien Oursel, Nicole D'Andria and Cheryl Black. Published by Action Lab Entertainment, Inc., 2016. 
 Miraculous: Tales of Ladybug and Cat Noir: Lucky Charm. Authored by Jeremy Zag, Thomas Astruc, Matthieu Choquet, Leonie de Rudder, Cedric Perrin, Jean-Christophe Herve, Nicole D'Andria and Cheryl Black. Published by Action Lab Entertainment, Inc., 2017. 
 Miraculous: Tales of Ladybug and Cat Noir : Claws Out. Authored by Jeremy Zag, Thomas Astruc, Cedric Bacconnier, Sebastien Thibaudeau, Pascal Boutboul, Michael Delachenal, Nicole D'Andria, and Cheryl Black. Published by Action Lab Entertainment, Inc., 2017. 
 Miraculous: Tales of Ladybug and Cat Noir: Akumatized. Authored by Jeremy Zag, Thomas Astruc, Regis Jaulin, Nicole D'Andria and Cheryl Black. Published by Action Lab Entertainment, Inc., 2017. 
 Miraculous: Tales of Ladybug and Cat Noir: Cataclysm. Authored by Jeremy Zag, Fred Lenoir, Guillaume Mautalent, Sebastien Oursel, Sebastien Thibaudeau, Nicole D'Andria and Cheryl Black. Published by Action Lab Entertainment, Inc., 2017. 
 Miraculous Adventures of Ladybug and Cat Noir: Volume 1 The Trash Krakken. Authored by Thomas Astruc, Bryan Seaton, Nicole D'Andria and Brian Hess. Published by Action Lab Entertainment, Inc., 2018. 
 Miraculous: Tales of Ladybug and Cat Noir: De-Evilize. Authored by Jeremy Zag, Thomas Astruc, Matthieu Choquet, Fred Lenoir, Guillaume Mautalent, Sebastien Oursel, Sophie Lodwitz, Eve Pisler, Nicole D'Andria and Cheryl Black. Published by Action Lab Entertainment, Inc., 2018. 
 Miraculous: Tales of Ladybug and Cat Noir: Season Two – Bye Bye, Little Butterfly!. Authored by Jeremy Zag, Thomas Astruc, Matthieu Choquet, Fred Lenoir, Sebastien Thibaudeau, Nolwenn Pierre, Nicole D'Andria and Cheryl Black. Published by Action Lab Entertainment, Inc., 2018. 
 Miraculous: Tales of Ladybug and Cat Noir: Santa Claws Christmas Special. Authored by Jeremy Zag, Thomas Astruc, Fred Lenoir, Sebastien Thibaudeau, Noam Kaniel, Nicole D'Andria and Cheryl Black. Published by Action Lab Entertainment, Inc., 2018. 
 Miraculous: Tales of Ladybug and Cat Noir: Season Two – The Chosen One. Authored by Jeremy Zag, Thomas Astruc, Matthieu Choquet, Fred Lenoir, Sebastien Thibaudeau, Nicole D'Andria and Cheryl Black. Published by Action Lab Entertainment, Inc., 2018. 
 Miraculous: Tales of Ladybug and Cat Noir: Bug Out. Authored by Jeremy Zag, Thomas Astruc, Sebastien Thibaudeau, Matthieu Choquet, Nicole D'Andria, Leonie de Rudder and Cheryl Black. Published by Action Lab Entertainment, Inc., 2018. 
 Miraculous Tales of Ladybug and Cat Noir Coloring Book : Wonderful Coloring Book With Premium Exclusive images. Authored by Evan Owens. Published by Createspace Independent Publishing Platform, 2018. 
 Miraculous Coloring Book : Tales of Ladybug and Cat Noir, This Amazing Coloring Book Will Make Your Kids Happier and Give Them Joy(ages 3–12). Authored by Mrs Qwerty. Published by Createspace Independent Publishing Platform, 2018. 
 Miraculous Coloring Book : Tales of Ladybug and Cat Noir Coloring Book for Kids, Hand-Drawn scenes, Volume 1 (42Pages). Authored by Leya Karsten. Published by Independently Published, 2019. 
 Miraculous Adventures of Ladybug and Cat Noir: Volume 2. Authored by Thomas Astruc, Melanie Duval, Fred Lenoir, Bryan Seaton, Sebastien Thibaudeau, Brian Hess, Darne Lang and Nicole D'Andria. Published by Action Lab Entertainment, Inc., 2019. 
 Miraculous: Tales of Ladybug and Cat Noir: Season Two – No More Evil-Doing. Authored by Jeremy Zag, Thomas Astruc, Melanie Duval, Matthieu Choquet, Fred Lenoir, Sebastien Thibaudeau, Nicole D'Andria and Cheryl Black. Published by Action Lab Entertainment, Inc., 2019. 
 Miraculous: Tales of Ladybug and Cat Noir: Season Two – A New Hero Emerges. Authored by Jeremy Zag, Thomas Astruc, Matthieu Choquet, Fred Lenoir, Sebastien Thibaudeau, Nicole D'Andria and Cheryl Black. Published by Action Lab Entertainment, Inc., 2019. 
 Miraculous: Tales of Ladybug and Cat Noir: Season Two – Double Trouble. Authored by Jeremy Zag, Thomas Astruc, Matthieu Choquet, Fred Lenoir, Sebastien Thibaudeau, Nolwenn Pierre, Nicole D'Andria and Cheryl Black. Published by Action Lab Entertainment, Inc., 2019. 
 Miraculous: Tales of Ladybug and Cat Noir: Season Two – Love Compass. Authored by Jeremy Zag, Thomas Astruc, Matthieu Choquet, Melanie Duval, Sebastien Thibaudeau, Fred Lenoir, Jean-Remi Perrin, Cheryl Black, Nicole D'Andria and Bryan Seaton. Published by Action Lab Entertainment, Inc., 2019. 
 Miraculous: Tales of Ladybug and Cat Noir: Season Two – Tear of Joy. Authored by Jeremy Zag, Thomas Astruc, Wilfried Pain, Melanie Duval, Sebastien Thibaudeau, Fred Lenoir, Nicole D'Andria and Cheryl Black. Published by Action Lab Entertainment, Inc., 2019. 
 Miraculous: Tales of Ladybug and Cat Noir: Season Two – Heroes' Day. Authored by Jeremy Zag, Thomas Astruc, Matthieu Choquet, Fred Lenoir, Sebastien Thibaudeau, Nicole D'Andria, Bryan Seaton, Cheryl Black and Brian Hess. Published by Action Lab Entertainment, Inc., 2020. 
 Miraculous: Tales of Ladybug and Cat Noir: Season Two – Queen's Battle. Authored by Jeremy Zag, Thomas Astruc, Melanie Duval, Fred Lenoir, Sebastien Thibaudeau, Nicole D'Andria and Cheryl Black. Published by Action Lab Entertainment, Inc., 2020. 
 Miraculous: Tales of Ladybug and Cat Noir: Season Two – Bugheads. Authored by Jeremy Zag, Thomas Astruc, Fred Lenoir, Sebastien Thibaudeau, Nicole D'Andria and Cheryl Black. Published by Action Lab Entertainment, Inc., 2020. 
 Miraculous: Tales of Ladybug and Cat Noir: Season Two – Skating on Thin Ice. Authored by Jeremy Zag, Thomas Astruc, Fred Lenoir, Melanie Duval, Sebastien Thibaudeau, Nicole D'Andria and Cheryl Black. Published by Action Lab Entertainment, Inc., 2020.

External links

 
 Miraculous at TF1 
 
 Official Japanese Website

Animated characters
, Miraculous Tales of Ladybug and Cat Noir
Lists of animated characters